Attila Czene (born 20 June 1974) is a former medley swimmer from Hungary, who won the gold medal in the 200 m individual medley at the 1996 Summer Olympics in Atlanta, Georgia. He competed in three consecutive Summer Olympics for his native country, starting in 1992.

Awards
  Cross of Merit of the Republic of Hungary – Bronze Cross (1992)
  Order of Merit of the Republic of Hungary – Officer's Cross (1996)
 Hungarian swimmer of the Year (2): 1996, 2000
 Immortal of Hungarian swimming (2014)

References
Profile on FINA-website

1974 births
Hungarian male swimmers
Male medley swimmers
Olympic swimmers of Hungary
Living people
Swimmers at the 1992 Summer Olympics
Swimmers at the 1996 Summer Olympics
Swimmers at the 2000 Summer Olympics
Olympic gold medalists for Hungary
Olympic bronze medalists for Hungary
Swimmers from Budapest
Sportspeople from Szeged
World record setters in swimming
Olympic bronze medalists in swimming
World Aquatics Championships medalists in swimming
Hungarian sportsperson-politicians
European Aquatics Championships medalists in swimming
Arizona State Sun Devils men's swimmers
21st-century Hungarian politicians
Medalists at the 1996 Summer Olympics
Medalists at the 1992 Summer Olympics
Olympic gold medalists in swimming